The United Arab Emirates national under-17 football team represents the United Arab Emirates in international under-17 football competitions and is controlled by the United Arab Emirates Football Association.

Competition Records

GCC U-17 Championship Record

FIFA U-17 World Cup Record

AFC U-16 Championship record

WAFF Championship

 Red border color indicates tournament was held on home soil.
*Draws also include penalty shootouts, regardless of the outcome.

Recent and forthcoming fixtures

2021

Individual awards
All Emiratis players who have won many individual awards With the UAE Under-17.

GCC U-17 Championship

Current Squads 
 Squad for the Under 18 WAFF Championship.

Head coach:  Ferdo Milin

Source:

Former squads 
1991 FIFA U-17 World Championship squads – UAE
2009 FIFA U-17 World Cup squads – UAE
2013 FIFA U-17 World Cup squads – UAE

References

External links
United Arab Emirates Football Association 

under-17
Asian national under-17 association football teams